Chesterfield was launched in 1806 at Portland. She served from November 1806 to her capture in October 1811, as a Post Office Packet Service packet, sailing between Weymouth and the Channel Islands. A French privateer captured her at the end of October 1811 in "a spirited but ineffectual" single ship action. She then became a French privateer that made several captures before the Royal Navy recaptured her.

Career
Captain Starr Wood took command of Chesterfield. From November 1806 to her capture in October 1811, she sailed between Weymouth and the Channel Islands.

On 17 June 1810, Chesterfield rescued five boys who were in a small boat that was drifting towards the rocks off Guernsey. The boys had sailed to Herm. When they set out to return their boat was unable to handle the currents, which were carrying them towards rocks.

At about 11a.m. on 12 January 1811, Chesterfield sailed from Guernsey, bound for Weymouth. At about 6p.m. she encountered a French privateer that was cruising between Guernsey and Jersey. At 8:30 the privateer, which had 14 guns and a large complement, came within 50 yards. Wood fired a broadside, at which the privateer sheered off.

Capture: Lloyd's List reported that a French privateer lugger had captured Earl of Chesterfield off Alderney as Earl of Chesterfield was sailing to Guernsey. Other reports give the vessel's name as Chesterfield.

Wood succeeded in sinking Chesterfields mails and dispatches before she was captured. In the engagement, one passenger was killed and several of her crew were wounded. The Post Office paid Wood £1,626 in compensation. He used the money to purchase another vessel, which he named .

French privateer
Chesterfield became the Cherbourg privateer L'Aigle. She was commissioned in 1811. She was armed with 14 guns and had a crew of 61 men under the command of Captain Alexandre William Black.

In 1812, L'Aigle, Captain Black, captured the ships Beaver and Pivert. Beaver, Beveridge, master, had been sailing from Mogador to London when she was captured on 1 March. She arrived on 4 March at Cherbourg. French sources report that the English vessel Peavert, of 130 tons (bm), arrived in Cherbourg in March. She was carrying a cargo of leather and sweet almonds.

On 1 May L'Aigle captured Eliza, Cole, for the second time. The schooner Arrow later drove Eliza ashore on the French coast, where she was destroyed.

On 7 May 1812, L'Aigle sailed from Bennodet, near Quimper.

Aigle had thrown eight of her 14 guns overboard while trying to escape Sybille. Aigle arrived at Cork on 15 July.

Notes

Citations

References
 
  
 
 

1806 ships
Age of Sail merchant ships of England
Packet (sea transport)
Captured ships
Privateer ships of France